William Raybould (ca 1836 – December 3, 1886) was a miner, merchant and political figure in British Columbia. He represented  Nanaimo in the Legislative Assembly of British Columbia from 1882 to 1886.

Raybould came to Vancouver Island with his wife, the former Phoebe Shakespeare, in 1864 from Staffordshire, England. In 1866, he opened a menswear store, the Nanaimo Emporium, in partnership with his brother-in-law Noah. He served as a member of the first Nanaimo City Council in 1875. He worked twenty years as pit head for a mine operated by the Vancouver Coal Company. Later in life, he assisted his wife with the management of her millinery shop. He died after falling from a wharf behind the shop while the tide was out, apparently investigating a noise from the shop. Raybould was 50 at the time.

References 

Year of birth uncertain
1886 deaths
English emigrants to pre-Confederation British Columbia
Independent MLAs in British Columbia
Accidental deaths from falls
Accidental deaths in British Columbia